Thomas D. Ganley (December 11, 1942 – August 24, 2016) was an American businessman and politician who was an unsuccessful Republican congressional candidate.

Early life and education
Tom Ganley was born on December 11, 1942 and was an Ohio native. As a member of the first graduating class of St. Peter Chanel High School in Bedford, Ohio, he became the first inductee into the school's hall of fame.

Ganley grew up in a middle-class home in Garfield Heights, Ohio.  His father was a mechanic on Brunswick automatic pin setting machines and his mother was a waitress.  Although his parents were not well educated, they stressed education for their son.

Business career
Ganley began selling motor vehicles as a part-time job while still a student at Chanel High School in Bedford, Ohio. He purchased his first new vehicle dealership, Eastway Rambler, in Euclid in 1968.  In 1975, Tom purchased an AMC-Jeep store in North Olmsted.  In 1978, Ganley became the owner of Ganley Lincoln-Mercury in Middleburg Heights, Budget Rent a Car at Cleveland Hopkins International Airport and Ganley Dodge of Bedford.  In 1979, he added Ganley Oldsmobile in Lakewood which eventually also sold Subaru and Suzuki.  During the recession of 1980–1981, Ganley consolidated the growth of his various businesses.  In 1982, he added Budget Rent a Car of Akron, followed by Parma Imports in 1983 and Ganley Dodge West in 1984.

Ganley Automotive Group
Tom Ganley oversaw what had become the largest automotive group in Ohio, comprising 32 dealerships and employing over 1,000 people.  Ganley had expanded his dealership holdings into Summit and Stark counties and established the Ganley name in Greater Columbus with the opening of a Mitsubishi dealership.  Under his leadership, the company continued to grow to include Chevrolet, Ford, and Chrysler as well as imports such as Mercedes-Benz, Toyota, Honda and BMW.

Lawsuits
In 2005, Ohio Attorney General Jim Petro took legal action against one of Ganley's dealerships, Ganley Ford West of Cleveland, for allegedly deceptive and unfair business practices in its advertising. Two days after Hurricane Katrina, the dealership had advertised special deals on cars moved out of Louisiana. After complaints from the Better Business Bureau, Petro initiated an investigation and found that Ganley had not received any cars from Louisiana.

Ganley had been sued more than 400 times in connection with his auto dealerships for complaints including age discrimination, gender discrimination and deceptive business practices. In April 2011, Ganley agreed to pay $300,000 to current and former black employees to settle a 2007 racial discrimination case.

Other business interests
Ganley had extended his business interests to include one of the largest independently owned auto financing companies in the nation as well as an insurance company.  He also sat on the Board of Directors of Independence Bank.

Political campaigns

2010 U.S. Senate campaign
 
Ganley formally announced his candidacy for the United States Senate (Ohio) on July 1, 2009.  In making his announcement Ganley stated "I am a businessman, not someone who ever thought about being a professional politician, but maybe that's what's needed in Washington now–someone who understands financial responsibility and what it takes for a business and a country to be competitive.  Someone who has built a business from scratch.  Someone who knows how to create jobs.  Someone who has met a payroll and knows his employees are dependent on him."

Ganley had talked openly earlier that year of his desire to enter the race for the United States Senate in order to give Ohio voters a clear choice.

Although Ganley had never served in elected office, he believed that he could win the Senate seat being vacated by George V. Voinovich.  Ganley said "I have a great passion to see this through to a conclusion, to a victory."  Ganley, because of his involvement in the business community in Ohio, had name recognition in northern Ohio.  He said that America needs businessmen in Washington, D.C. and that he believed the time of the career politician may be ending.

On February 18, 2010 Ganley abruptly made the decision to end his bid for the Republican nomination for the US Senate.

2010 U.S. Congressional campaign

After ending his race for the US Senate and instead devoted his energy to running for the US House of Representatives, in the 13th District of Ohio against incumbent Democrat Betty Sutton. Ganley filed a petition with the Summit County elections board to run for the House seat, immediately making the contest a toss-up.

On July 13, 2010, the National Republican Congressional Committee (NRCC) announced that Tom Ganley had advanced to the top level of the Young Guns Program of the NRCC, despite being 67 years old. According to the NRCC "Ganley has proven his ability to build a winning campaign and achieve substantial fundraising goals."

The Democratic Congressional Campaign Committee launched attacks against Ganley, accusing him of being a dishonest car salesman attempting to buy his way into Congress. Cleveland Police Patrolmen's Association President Stephen Loomis responded to that charge by pointing out that Ganley is a major supporter of police charities and regularly donates his private plane to bring out-of-town family members to the funerals or bedsides of fallen local police officers.  Loomis was quoted as saying "Don't let them beat him up too badly about having a corporate airplane because he uses it selflessly. It is unfair if they are trying to portray him as some kind of corporate, egomaniac, big money guy."

Ganley easily won the Republican primary on May 4, 2010.   Shortly before the primary, Ganley received the endorsement of Ohio's Morning Journal newspaper.

Ganley also received the endorsement of former Arkansas Governor Mike Huckabee.

Sutton defeated Ganley 60.3% to 39.6% in the November 2, 2010 general election.

Role in taking down the Cleveland Mob
According to Ganley, in the 1980s the Cleveland mafia attempted to extort Ganley for $500,000. Ganley began to cooperate with the Cleveland division of the Federal Bureau of Investigation after his refusal to pay and Ganley was messaged he was to be killed. Ganley was provided money by the FBI to pay off the mob, and had his phone tapped, and cameras and recording equipment installed in his offices. After Ganley became known to be cooperating with the FBI, the mafia put a $1,000,000 contract on Ganley and his family. The FBI provided Ganley with an armored, bullet and bomb proof car, and moved agents into his home for his protection. One of those agents was Joseph Pistone, the subject of the 1997 Johnny Depp and Al Pacino film Donnie Brasco. Ganley's cooperation led to conviction of over 20 Cleveland mafia figures. For his work in the fight against the Cleveland mob Ganley was awarded the Louis E. Peters Memorial Service Award by the Society of Former Special Agents.

Ganley appeared on the Fox News Network show "Huckabee" as a guest of former Governor Mike Huckabee to talk about his involvement in the FBI operation against the Cleveland mafia.  Appearing with him on that show was FBI special agent Bob Friedman.  Ganley said "If I didn't back down to the mafia when they were threatening my entire family I am certainly not going to back down in Congress."

Dismissal of sexual assault charges and lawsuit
On September 30, 2010, a 39-year-old Cleveland woman filed a lawsuit against Ganley in civil court, accusing him of sexual assault and attempted rape.  The lawsuit alleges that Ganley propositioned and groped the woman, whom he met at a Tea Party rally, when she approached him about volunteering for his campaign.  She later amended the complaint to include employment discrimination, based on her claim that Ganley wouldn't give her a job because she refused his sexual advances.  Ganley's attorney said that the charges amounted to extortion and that they were motivated by politics. The woman, a Republican Tea Party activist, sought more than $25,000 in damages. On March 15, 2011 a Cuyahoga County Grand Jury indicted Ganley on seven counts, including three counts of gross sexual imposition, one count of kidnapping, one count of abduction, one count of soliciting and one count of menacing by stalking. The Cuyahoga County Prosecutor dropped the charges in July, 2011 after the victim expressed a desire not to go to trial.

Ganley called the accusations "lies, slander and false", and "has maintained his innocence and said that the accusations are being made for political or financial gain."

In 2013, the suit was settled and the case dismissed, with Ganley continuing to vehemently deny wrongdoing.  The terms of the settlement were not made public; Ganley was charged for the court costs.

Personal life
Ganley and his wife Lois had four children, Denise, Thomas, Robert and Kenneth, and eight grandchildren.  Each of the Ganley's children have worked in the family business "The Ganley Automotive Group", headquartered in Cleveland, Ohio. Ganley died on August 24, 2016 at the age of 73.

Community involvement
Ganley served as the spokesperson for "Buckle-Up Cleveland," an automotive safety initiative, sponsored by the Cleveland Police Department and the Ohio State Highway Patrol.  In May 2001, he was named president and CEO of Crime Stoppers of Northern Ohio.  This organization, funded in part by Mr. Ganley as well as private donations, offers cash rewards for crime tipsters.

Ganley was named "Man of the Year" by the Cuyahoga County Police Chiefs Association for his leadership and outstanding support of law enforcement in the Cleveland area.  Other special recognition awards were received from the Ohio House of Representatives and Ohio Senate for outstanding accomplishment, the "Gold & Silver Award" from the Northern Ohio Law Enforcement Community and the honor of being the Cleveland Police Historical Society's Man of the Year.  Tom also received the Louis E. Peters Memorial Service Award from an FBI alumni society in 2007.

Ganley remained active in the business community.  He represented metropolitan Cleveland's franchised new car dealers on the National Automobile Dealers Association.  He served on the Association's Regulation Affairs Committee and as Mercedes-Benz Chairman of the Industry Relations Committee.  Previously, he had served on the Government Relations Committee.

References

External links
 
Campaign contributions from OpenSecrets.org

2016 deaths
1942 births
Ohio Republicans
Businesspeople from Cleveland
Politicians from Cleveland
20th-century American businesspeople